This is a list of municipalities in the Czech Republic which have standing links to local communities in other countries known as "town twinning" (usually in Europe) or "sister cities" (usually in the rest of the world).

A
Adršpach

 Lubawka, Poland
 Radków, Poland

Albrechtice nad Orlicí
 Wörgl, Austria

Albrechtice nad Vltavou
 Siselen, Switzerland

Andělská Hora
 Reńska Wieś, Poland

Aš

 Fiumefreddo di Sicilia, Italy
 Marktbreit, Germany
 Oelsnitz, Germany
 Plauen, Germany
 Rehau, Germany

B

Be–Bi
Bělá nad Radbuzou

 Eslarn, Germany
 Hindelbank, Switzerland

Bělá pod Bezdězem

 Groß-Bieberau, Germany
 Svätý Jur, Slovakia

Bělá pod Pradědem
 Tułowice, Poland

Bělotín

 Hinterschmiding, Germany
 Höchst im Odenwald, Germany
 Kolonowskie, Poland

Benátky nad Jizerou

 Hustopeče, Czech Republic
 Modra, Slovakia

 Reinsdorf, Germany
 Roßdorf, Germany

Benešov

 Partizánske, Slovakia
 Sainte-Agnès, France

Benešov nad Ploučnicí
 Heidenau, Germany

Beroun

 Brzeg, Poland
 Goslar, Germany

Bílina

 Biłgoraj, Poland
 Dippoldiswalde, Germany
 Jaraczewo, Poland
 Kobylí, Czech Republic
 Novovolynsk, Ukraine
 Stropkov, Slovakia

Bílovec

 Bad Neustadt an der Saale, Germany
 Kietrz, Poland
 Lipany, Slovakia

Bl–Bo
Blansko

 Komárno, Slovakia
 Legnica, Poland
 Mürzzuschlag, Austria
 Scandiano, Italy

Blatná

 Roggwil, Switzerland
 Sargé-lès-le-Mans, France
 Vacha, Germany
 Važec, Slovakia

Blatnička
 Falkenstein, Austria

Blovice

 Teublitz, Germany
 Triptis, Germany

Bludov
 Lehota pod Vtáčnikom, Slovakia

Bochov
 Thiersheim, Germany

Bohdíkov
 Nitrianske Sučany, Slovakia

Bohumín

 Gorzyce, Poland
 Prudnik, Poland

Bojkovice
 Trenčianska Turná, Slovakia

Bolatice

 Doľany, Slovakia
 Linum (Fehrbellin), Germany
 Nagykovácsi, Hungary
 Rudy (Kuźnia Raciborska), Poland

Bor

 Pleystein, Germany
 Wernberg-Köblitz, Germany

Boskovice

 Frasnes-lez-Anvaing, Belgium
 Levice, Slovakia
 Prnjavor, Bosnia and Herzegovina
 Rawa Mazowiecka, Poland

Br
Brandýs nad Labem-Stará Boleslav

 Dunaivtsi, Ukraine
 Gödöllő, Hungary
 Montescudaio, Italy

Branka u Opavy
 Kornowac, Poland

Břeclav

 Andrychów, Poland
 Brezová pod Bradlom, Slovakia
 Lysá nad Labem, Czech Republic
 Nový Bor, Czech Republic
 Priverno, Italy
 Trnava, Slovakia

Březina
 Valaská Dubová, Slovakia

Březnice
 Lindow, Germany

Brno

 Bratislava, Slovakia
 Dallas, United States
 Debrecen, Hungary
 Kaunas, Lithuania
 Kharkiv, Ukraine
 Leeds, England, United Kingdom
 Leipzig, Germany
 Poznań, Poland
 Rennes, France
 Sankt Pölten, Austria
 Stuttgart, Germany

Brno-Bosonohy
 Abbadia Lariana, Italy

Brno-Vinohrady
 Vajnory (Bratislava), Slovakia

Broumov

 Forchheim, Germany
 Nowa Ruda, Poland

Brtnice
 Orpund, Switzerland

Brumov-Bylnice
 Horné Srnie, Slovakia

Brumovice
 Záhorská Bystrica (Bratislava), Slovakia

Bruntál

 Büdingen, Germany
 Castellarano, Italy
 Opole, Poland
 Plungė, Lithuania
 Štúrovo, Slovakia

Bu–Bz
Bučovice
 Zlaté Moravce, Slovakia

Budišov nad Budišovkou

 Głubczyce County, Poland
 Mszana, Poland
 Stráňavy, Slovakia

Budyně nad Ohří
 Hohnstein, Germany

Buštěhrad
 Ledro, Italy

Bystré
 Hohenems, Austria

Bystřice

 Goleszów, Poland
 Pińczów, Poland
 Svodín, Slovakia
 Tata, Hungary

Bystřice nad Pernštejnem

 Boguchwała, Poland
 Crimmitschau, Germany

 Vranov nad Topľou, Slovakia

Bystřice pod Hostýnem

 Salzkotten, Germany
 San Giovanni al Natisone, Italy

Bzenec

 Egeln, Germany
 Mûrs-Erigné, France

C

Ca–Ce
Čáslav
 Opfikon, Switzerland

Častolovice
 Kondratowice, Poland

Čejetice
 Oberwil im Simmental, Switzerland

Černošice

 Gerbrunn, Germany
 Leśnica, Poland
 Themar, Germany

Černošín
 Pullenreuth, Germany

Černovice
 Biglen, Switzerland

Černý Důl
 Kowary, Poland

Červená Řečice
 Kirchdorf, Switzerland

Červený Kostelec

 Küsnacht, Switzerland
 Uchte, Germany
 Warrington, England, United Kingdom
 Ząbkowice Śląskie, Poland

Česká Kamenice
 Bad Schandau, Germany

Česká Lípa

 Bardejov, Slovakia
 Bolesławiec, Poland
 Mittweida, Germany
 Molde, Norway
 Uzhhorod, Ukraine

Česká Skalice

 Bardo, Poland
 Liptovský Hrádok, Slovakia
 Polanica-Zdrój, Poland
 Rüschlikon, Switzerland
 Warrington, England, United Kingdom

Česká Třebová

 Agrate Brianza, Italy
 Horní Lhota, Czech Republic
 Oława, Poland
 Svit, Slovakia

České Budějovice

 Linz, Austria
 Lorient, France
 Nitra, Slovakia
 Passau, Germany
 Suhl, Germany

Český Brod
 Köngen, Germany

Český Krumlov

 Hauzenberg, Germany
 Kalush, Ukraine
 Llanwrtyd Wells, Wales, United Kingdom
 Miami Beach, United States
 San Gimignano, Italy
 Slovenj Gradec, Slovenia
 Vöcklabruck, Austria

Český Těšín

 Cieszyn, Poland
 Rožňava, Slovakia

Ch
Chabařovice

 Drebach, Germany
 Ždiar, Slovakia

Cheb

 Bắc Ninh, Vietnam
 Hof, Germany
 Nová Dubnica, Slovakia

Chlebičov
 Liptovské Revúce, Slovakia

Chlumec nad Cidlinou
 Valaská, Slovakia

Chodov

 Oelsnitz, Germany
 Waldsassen, Germany

Chodová Planá
 Störnstein, Germany

Chomutov

 Annaberg-Buchholz, Germany

 Bernburg, Germany
 Trnava, Slovakia

Chotěboř

 Tiachiv, Ukraine
 Tiszafüred, Hungary

Chrastava

 Eichstätt, Germany
 Lwówek Śląski, Poland

Chrudim

 Motovun, Croatia
 Oleśnica, Poland
 Svidník, Slovakia
 Znojmo, Czech Republic

Chyňava
 Ledro, Italy

Chýnov
 Oberthal, Switzerland

D

Da–Di
Dačice

 Groß-Siegharts, Austria
 Urtenen-Schönbühl, Switzerland

Darkovice
 Lyski, Poland

Děčín

 Bełchatów, Poland
 Jonava, Lithuania
 Pirna, Germany
 Přerov, Czech Republic
 Ružomberok, Slovakia

Desná

 Malschwitz, Germany
 Podgórzyn, Poland

Díly
 Rötz, Germany

Dírná
 Forst-Längenbühl, Switzerland

Do
Dobrá

 Buczkowice, Poland
 Mucharz, Poland
 Ochodnica, Slovakia

Dobřany

 Brežice, Slovenia
 Dobřany, Czech Republic
 Obertraubling, Germany

Dobratice
 Zábiedovo, Slovakia

Dobřichovice

 Manhattan, United States
 Villieu-Loyes-Mollon, France

Dobříš

 Geldrop-Mierlo, Netherlands
 Tonnerre, France

Dobronín
 Bellmund, Switzerland

Dobruška

 Ábrahámhegy, Hungary
 Hnúšťa, Slovakia
 Miejska Górka, Poland
 Piława Górna, Poland
 Radków, Poland
 Veľký Meder, Slovakia

Doksy (Česká Lípa District)

 Bolków, Poland
 Oybin, Germany

Doksy (Kladno District)
 Ledro, Italy

Dolní Bečva
 Kamenec pod Vtáčnikom, Slovakia

Dolní Benešov

 Rajecké Teplice, Slovakia
 Wilamowice, Poland

Dolní Bukovsko
 Kallnach, Switzerland

Dolní Čermná

 Dzierżoniów, Poland
 Kazár, Hungary
 Liptovská Teplička, Slovakia
 Velykyi Bereznyi, Ukraine

Dolní Dobrouč
 Rovereto, Italy

Dolní Domaslavice
 Strumień, Poland

Dolní Kounice

 Azay-le-Brûlé, France
 Caprese Michelangelo, Italy

Dolní Lutyně

 Godów, Poland
 Gorzyce, Poland

Dolní Němčí
 Myjava, Slovakia

Dolní Poustevna
 Sebnitz, Germany

Domažlice

 Furth bei Göttweig, Austria
 Furth im Wald, Germany
 Ludres, France
 Two Rivers, United States

Dr–Dv
Dřevohostice
 Turawa, Poland

Dubá
 Mirsk, Poland

Dubí

 Altenberg, Germany
 Arnstadt, Germany
 Bannewitz, Germany

Duchcov

 Miltenberg, Germany
 Mulda, Germany

Dvorce
 Strzeleczki, Poland

Dvůr Králové nad Labem

 Kamienna Góra, Poland
 Piegaro, Italy
 Verneuil-en-Halatte, France

F
Františkovy Lázně
 Bad Soden, Germany

Frenštát pod Radhoštěm

 Harrachov, Czech Republic
 Krásno nad Kysucou, Slovakia
 La Grange, United States
 Ustroń, Poland

Frýdek-Místek

 Bielsko-Biała, Poland
 Harelbeke, Belgium
 Mysłowice, Poland
 Žilina, Slovakia
 Żywiec County, Poland

Frýdlant

 Friedland, Brandenburg, Germany
 Friedland, Lower Saxony, Germany
 Friedland, Mecklenburg-Vorpommern, Germany
 Frýdlant nad Ostravicí, Czech Republic
 Korfantów, Poland
 Mieroszów, Poland
 Pravdinsk, Russia
 Siekierczyn, Poland

Frýdlant nad Ostravicí

 Debrzno, Poland
 Dravograd, Slovenia
 Friedland, Brandenburg, Germany
 Friedland, Lower Saxony, Germany
 Friedland, Mecklenburg-Vorpommern, Germany
 Frýdlant, Czech Republic
 Korfantów, Poland
 Mieroszów, Poland
 Mirosławiec, Poland
 Pravdinsk, Russia
 Radeburg, Germany
 Turzovka, Slovakia

Fryšták

 Kanianka, Slovakia
 Muráň, Slovakia

Fulnek

 Châtel-sur-Moselle, France
 Łaziska Górne, Poland
 Ljutomer, Slovenia
 Sučany, Slovakia
 Téglás, Hungary
 Vrútky, Slovakia

H

Ha–Hl
Habartov

 Bad Berneck, Germany
 Lengenfeld, Germany

Hanušovice
 Nitrianske Pravno, Slovakia

Hartmanice

 Affoltern im Emmental, Switzerland
 Rinchnach, Germany

Havířov

 Collegno, Italy
 Harlow, England, United Kingdom
 Jastrzębie-Zdrój, Poland
 Mažeikiai, Lithuania
 Omiš, Croatia
 Paide, Estonia
 Turčianske Teplice, Slovakia
 Zagorje ob Savi, Slovenia

Havlíčkův Brod

 Brielle, Netherlands
 Brixen, Italy
 Spišská Nová Ves, Slovakia

Hejnice
 Łęknica, Poland

Heřmanice

 Pieńsk, Poland
 Sobota (Lwówek Śląski), Poland

Hlinsko

 Púchov, Slovakia
 Stara Pazova, Serbia

Hluboká nad Vltavou

 Bolligen, Switzerland
 Grein, Austria
 Neustadt an der Aisch, Germany

Hlučín

 Namysłów, Poland
 Nebelschütz, Germany
 Ružomberok, Slovakia

Hluk

 Nemšová, Slovakia
 Planá nad Lužnicí, Czech Republic

Ho
Hodkovice nad Mohelkou
 Węgliniec, Poland

Hodonín

 Holíč, Slovakia
 Jasło, Poland
 Skalica, Slovakia
 Trebišov, Slovakia
 Zistersdorf, Austria

Holešov

 Desinić, Croatia
 Považská Bystrica, Slovakia
 Pszczyna, Poland
 Skawina, Poland
 Topoľčianky, Slovakia
 Turčianske Teplice, Slovakia

Holice

 Medzev, Slovakia
 Strzelce Opolskie, Poland

Holýšov

 Kümmersbruck, Germany
 Port, Switzerland

Horažďovice
 Heimberg, Switzerland

Hořice

 Jabłonka, Poland
 Kerepes, Hungary
 Strzegom, Poland
 Trstená, Slovakia

Horní Benešov
 Pszów, Poland

Horní Bříza
 Villeneuve-sur-Yonne, France

Horní Jiřetín
 Battenberg, Germany

Horní Lideč
 Dohňany, Slovakia

Horní Planá
 Ulrichsberg, Austria

Horní Slavkov

 Arzberg, Germany
 Sławków, Poland

Horní Suchá

 Gelnica, Slovakia
 Lubomia, Poland
 Nižná, Slovakia

Hořovice
 Gau-Algesheim, Germany

Horšovský Týn

 Maarkedal, Belgium
 Nabburg, Germany

Hostinné

 Bensheim, Germany
 Wojcieszów, Poland

Hostouň
 Waldthurn, Germany

Hr–Hv
Hradec Králové

 Alessandria, Italy
 Arnhem, Netherlands
 Banská Bystrica, Slovakia
 Chernihiv, Ukraine
 Giessen, Germany
 Kaštela, Croatia
 Metz, France
 Wałbrzych, Poland
 Wrocław, Poland

Hradec nad Moravicí

 Baborów, Poland
 Liptovský Hrádok, Slovakia

Hrádek

 Čierne, Slovakia
 Skoczów, Poland

Hrádek nad Nisou

 Bogatynia, Poland
 Kralupy nad Vltavou, Czech Republic
 Zittau, Germany

Hradištko
 Essen, Belgium

Hranice

 Hlohovec, Slovakia
 Konstancin-Jeziorna, Poland
 Leidschendam-Voorburg, Netherlands
 Slovenske Konjice, Slovenia

Hronov

 Bielawa, Poland
 Kudowa-Zdrój, Poland
 Nowa Ruda (rural gmina), Poland
 Warrington, England, United Kingdom

Hrušky
 Waldbredimus, Luxembourg

Hukvaldy
 Wisła, Poland

Hulín
 Zlaté Moravce, Slovakia

Humpolec

 Námestovo, Slovakia

Husinec
 Beatenberg, Switzerland

Hustopeče

 Benátky nad Jizerou, Czech Republic
 Miedźna, Poland
 Modra, Slovakia

Hutisko-Solanec
 Makov, Slovakia

Hvozdná
 East Bernard, United States

Hynčice
 Radków, Poland

I
Ivančice

 Radovljica, Slovenia
 Sládkovičovo, Slovakia
 Soyaux, France
 Stupava, Slovakia

J
Jablonec nad Jizerou
 Sulzbach, Germany

Jablonec nad Nisou

 Bautzen, Germany
 Beihai, China
 Jelenia Góra, Poland
 Kaufbeuren, Germany
 Marsciano, Italy
 Ronse, Belgium
 Zwickau, Germany

Jablonné nad Orlicí

 Hinwil, Switzerland
 Kondratowice, Poland 
 Seehausen, Germany

Jablunkov

 Gogolin, Poland
 Kysucké Nové Mesto, Slovakia
 Siemianowice Śląskie, Poland
 Tiachiv, Ukraine

Jáchymov
 Schneeberg, Germany

Janské Lázně
 Polanica-Zdrój, Poland

Jaroměř

 Warrington, England, United Kingdom
 Ziębice, Poland

Javorník

 Otmuchów, Poland
 Złoty Stok, Poland

Jedovnice
 Aschheim, Germany

Jemnice

 Raabs an der Thaya, Austria
 Reszel, Poland

Jeseník

 Bojnice, Slovakia
 Głuchołazy, Poland
 Neuburg an der Donau, Germany
 Nysa, Poland

Jevíčko

 Abasha, Georgia
 Martvili, Georgia

Jičín

 Erbach im Odenwald, Germany
 Martin, Slovakia
 Świdnica County, Poland

Jihlava

 Heidenheim an der Brenz, Germany
 Uzhhorod, Ukraine
 Zgierz, Poland

Jilemnice

 Świebodzice, Poland
 Świeradów-Zdrój, Poland

Jílové
 Rosenthal-Bielatal, Germany

Jílové u Prahy

 Holzgerlingen, Germany
 Nováky, Slovakia
 Peschici, Italy

Jimramov
 Meyrargues, France

Jindřichov
 Hennersdorf, Austria

Jindřichovice pod Smrkem
 Świeradów-Zdrój, Poland

Jindřichův Hradec

 Dunajská Streda, Slovakia
 Neckargemünd, Germany
 Sárospatak, Hungary
 Zwettl, Austria

Jirkov

 Bátonyterenye, Hungary
 Brand-Erbisdorf, Germany
 Kobylnica, Poland
 Šentjur, Slovenia

K

Ka
Kadaň

 Aue-Bad Schlema, Germany
 Halle, Belgium
 Vara, Sweden

Kamenický Šenov
 Rheinbach, Germany

Kamenná
 Łambinowice, Poland

Kamenný Újezd
 Krauchthal, Switzerland

Kanice
 Spillern, Austria

Kaplice
 Freistadt, Austria

Kardašova Řečice
 Oberdiessbach, Switzerland

Karlovy Vary

 Baden-Baden, Germany
 Bernkastel-Kues, Germany
 Carlsbad, United States
 Eilat, Israel
 Kusatsu, Japan
 Locarno, Switzerland
 Varberg, Sweden

Karlštejn

 Althen-des-Paluds, France
 Montecarlo, Italy
 Reichenbach im Vogtland, Germany

Karolinka

 Bytča, Slovakia
 Papradno, Slovakia
 Vysoká nad Kysucou, Slovakia

Karviná

 Jastrzębie-Zdrój, Poland
 Jaworzno, Poland
 Kaili, China
 Rybnik, Poland
 Wodzisław Śląski, Poland

Kašava

 Breitenbach, France
 Rohožník, Slovakia

Kašperské Hory
 Grafenau, Germany

Ke–Ko
Kelč
 Ladce, Slovakia

Kladno

 Bellevue, United States
 Vitry-sur-Seine, France

Klášterec nad Ohří
 Großrückerswalde, Germany

Klatovy

 Cham, Germany
 Poligny, France

Klenčí pod Čerchovem

 Dürrenroth, Switzerland
 Herent, Belgium
 Kleneč, Czech Republic
 Waldmünchen, Germany

Klimkovice

 Ilava, Slovakia
 Mikołów, Poland

Kolín

 Dietikon, Switzerland
 Duino-Aurisina, Italy
 Érd, Hungary
 Kamenz, Germany
 Lubań, Poland
 Rimavská Sobota, Slovakia

Kolinec

 Tápiószentmárton, Hungary
 Zemianska Olča, Slovakia

Komorní Lhotka
 Boronów, Poland

Kopřivnice

 Bánovce nad Bebravou, Slovakia
 Castiglione del Lago, Italy
 Myszków, Poland
 Trappes, France
 Zwönitz, Germany

Koryčany
 Lehota, Slovakia

Košařiska

 Dunajov, Slovakia
 Rajcza, Poland

Košíky
 Nová Bošáca, Slovakia

Kosmonosy
 Seeheim-Jugenheim, Germany

Košťany

 Košťany nad Turcom, Slovakia
 Valaliky, Slovakia

Kostelec nad Černými lesy
 Mamirolle, France

Kostelec nad Orlicí

 Bielawa, Poland
 Myjava, Slovakia
 Zeulenroda-Triebes, Germany

Kotvrdovice
 Aschheim, Germany

Kovářov
 Seftigen, Switzerland

Kovářská
 Sehmatal, Germany

Kr
Králíky

 Międzylesie, Poland
 Solbiate Olona, Italy
 Villmar, Germany

Králova Lhota
 Kráľova Lehota, Slovakia

Kralupy nad Vltavou

 Banyuls-sur-Mer, France
 Hennigsdorf, Germany
 Hrádek nad Nisou, Czech Republic
 Komárno, Slovakia
 Miren-Kostanjevica, Slovenia
 Šabac, Serbia
 Środa Wielkopolska, Poland

Kraslice
 Klingenthal, Germany

Krásná

 Bziny, Slovakia
 Wilkowice, Poland

Krásná Lípa

 Kottmar, Germany
 Sebnitz, Germany
 Żyrardów, Poland

Krásno
 Bischofsgrün, Germany

Kravaře

 Lisková, Slovakia
 Lubliniec, Poland
 Woźniki, Poland

Krnov

 Głubczyce, Poland
 Karben, Germany
 Lykovrysi-Pefki, Greece
 Mińsk Mazowiecki, Poland
 Nadvirna, Ukraine
 Prudnik, Poland
 Rajec, Slovakia
 Saint-Égrève, France
 Telšiai, Lithuania

Kroměříž

 Châteaudun, France
 Nitra, Slovakia
 Krems an der Donau, Austria
 Piekary Śląskie, Poland
 Râmnicu Vâlcea, Romania
 Ružomberok, Slovakia

Krupka
 Geising (Altenberg), Germany

Ku–Ky
Kunín
 Leimen, Germany

Kunovice

 Pocheon, South Korea
 Stará Turá, Slovakia
 West, United States

Kunratice
 Pieńsk, Poland

Kunštát
 Stari Grad, Croatia

Kunvald
 Lititz, United States

Kuřim

 Niepołomice, Poland
 Stupava, Slovakia

Kutná Hora

 Bingen am Rhein, Germany
 Eger, Hungary
 Fidenza, Italy
 Jajce, Bosnia and Herzegovina
 Kamianets-Podilskyi, Ukraine
 Kremnica, Slovakia
 Reims, France
 Ringsted, Denmark
 Stamford, England, United Kingdom
 Tarnowskie Góry, Poland

Kyjov

 Biograd na Moru, Croatia
 Hollabrunn, Austria
 Lutsk, Ukraine
 Prizren, Kosovo
 Seravezza, Italy
 Yvetot, France

Kynšperk nad Ohří
 Himmelkron, Germany

L

La–Le
Lanškroun

 Castiglione in Teverina, Italy
 Dzierżoniów, Poland
 Hajdúszoboszló, Hungary
 Kežmarok, Slovakia
 Serock, Poland

Lanžhot
 Rabensburg, Austria

Lázně Bělohrad
 Belene, Bulgaria

Lázně Kynžvart
 Bad Bocklet, Germany

Lázně Libverda

 Mirsk, Poland
 Świeradów-Zdrój, Poland
 Trzebiel, Poland

Letohrad

 Daruvar, Croatia
 Hausen am Albis, Switzerland
 Niemcza, Poland

Letovice

 Chełmno, Poland
 Kirchlinteln, Germany
 Kőbánya (Budapest), Hungary
 Slepčany, Slovakia
 Stari Grad, Croatia

Lety
 Ailertchen, Germany

Li
Libčany
 Le Mêle-sur-Sarthe, France

Libchavy
 Strzelin, Poland

Libčice nad Vltavou
 Moresco, Italy

Liberec

 Augsburg, Germany
 Nahariya, Israel
 Zittau, Germany

Lichkov
 Międzylesie, Poland

Lidice

 Coventry, England, United Kingdom
 Marzabotto, Italy

Lipník nad Bečvou
 Zdzieszowice, Poland

Lipová-lázně
 Krapkowice, Poland

Liptál

 Cañas, Costa Rica
 Tilarán, Costa Rica

Lišov

 Schüpfen, Switzerland
 Varmo, Italy

Litoměřice

 Armentières, France
 Calamba, Philippines
 Dapitan, Philippines
 Fulda, Germany
 Meissen, Germany

Litomyšl

 Levoča, Slovakia
 Noordenveld, Netherlands
 San Polo d'Enza, Italy

Litovel

 Littau (Lucerne), Switzerland
 Revúca, Slovakia
 Wieliczka, Poland

Litvínov

 Brie-Comte-Robert, France
 Olbernhau, Germany

Lo–Ly
Loket
 Illertissen, Germany

Lomnice
 Veľká Lomnica, Slovakia

Lomnice nad Lužnicí

 Bad Großpertholz, Austria
 Dießen am Ammersee, Germany

Loučná nad Desnou
 Sośnicowice, Poland

Louny

 Barendrecht, Netherlands
 Lučenec, Slovakia
 Moret-Loing-et-Orvanne, France
 Zschopau, Germany

Lovosice
 Coswig, Germany

Luby

 Bubenreuth, Germany
 Markneukirchen, Germany

Ludgeřovice

 Putnok, Hungary
 Tisovec, Slovakia

Luhačovice

 Piešťany, Slovakia
 Topoľčany, Slovakia
 Ustroń, Poland

Luka nad Jihlavou

 Forst, Germany
 Reutigen, Switzerland

Lužice
 Isdes, France

Lysá nad Labem

 Břeclav, Czech Republic
 Głogów Małopolski, Poland
 Kukeziv, Ukraine

M

Ma–Me
Machov
 Radków, Poland

Malá Morávka

 Kobylnica, Poland
 Walce, Poland

Malá Skála
 Świerzawa, Poland

Malá Úpa
 Kowary, Poland

Mariánské Lázně

 Bad Homburg vor der Höhe, Germany
 Chianciano Terme, Italy
 Kiryat Motzkin, Israel
 Malvern, England, United Kingdom
 Marcoussis, France
 Weiden in der Oberpfalz, Germany

Medlov
 Borów, Poland

Mělník

 Lučenec, Slovakia
 Oranienburg, Germany
 Przeworsk, Poland
 Sandanski, Bulgaria 
 Wetzikon, Switzerland

Město Albrechtice

 Biała, Poland
 Głubczyce, Poland
 Komprachcice, Poland

 Precenicco, Italy

Metylovice
 Krásno nad Kysucou, Slovakia

Meziboří

 Sayda, Germany
 Sogliano al Rubicone, Italy

Mi–Mn
Mikulov

 Bardejov, Slovakia 
 Galanta, Slovakia  
Katzrin, Golan Heights

 Šumperk, Czech Republic
 Tuchów, Poland

Mikulovice

 Głuchołazy, Poland
 Pakosławice, Poland

Milevsko
 Münchenbuchsee, Switzerland

Milíkov
 Milówka, Poland

Milín
 Ledro, Italy

Milovice

 Kistarcsa, Hungary
 Vynnyky, Ukraine

Mimoň

 Nová Baňa, Slovakia
 Oelsnitz, Germany
 Złotoryja, Poland

Miroslav
 Medzev, Slovakia

Mirovice
 Bätterkinden, Switzerland

Mladá Boleslav

 Dieburg, Germany
 Fano, Italy
 Pezinok, Slovakia
 Vantaa, Finland

Mnichovo Hradiště

 Chojnów, Poland
 Erzhausen, Germany
 Figline e Incisa Valdarno, Italy

Mo–My
Modrá

 Bojná, Slovakia
 Modra nad Cirochou, Slovakia
 Uhrovec, Slovakia

Mohelnice
 Radlin, Poland

Moravská Třebová

 Banská Štiavnica, Slovakia
 Staufenberg, Germany
 Vlaardingen, Netherlands

Moravské Budějovice

 Kalwaria Zebrzydowska, Poland
 Kautzen, Austria
 Pulkau, Austria
 Šaštín-Stráže, Slovakia

Moravský Beroun

 Bieruń, Poland
 Gundelfingen, Germany
 Meung-sur-Loire, France
 Ostroh, Ukraine
 Scheibenberg, Germany
 Teplička nad Váhom, Slovakia

Moravský Krumlov
 Przeworsk, Poland

Morkovice-Slížany
 Žitavany, Slovakia

Most

 Marienberg, Germany
 Meppel, Netherlands

Myštice
 Riggisberg, Switzerland

Mýto
 Berga, Germany

N

Na–Ni
Náchod

 Bauska, Latvia
 Halberstadt, Germany
 Kudowa-Zdrój, Poland
 Kłodzko, Poland
 Partizánske, Slovakia
 Persan, France
 Tiachiv, Ukraine
 Warrington, England, United Kingdom

Náklo
 Nakło nad Notecią, Poland

Náměšť na Hané

 Levice, Slovakia
 Szczytna, Poland

Náměšť nad Oslavou
 Medzilaborce, Slovakia

Napajedla

 Borský Mikuláš, Slovakia
 Kľak, Slovakia
 Ostrý Grúň, Slovakia

Nechanice
 Czarny Bór, Poland

Nejdek
 Johanngeorgenstadt, Germany

Nepomuk

 Anykščiai, Lithuania
 Bušince, Slovakia
 Hukvaldy, Czech Republic
 Kemnath, Germany
 Krupina, Slovakia
 Omiš, Croatia
 Roermond, Netherlands
 São João Nepomuceno, Brazil
 Wisła, Poland

Neratovice
 Radeberg, Germany

Netolice
 Ringelai, Germany

Nišovice
 Kallnach, Switzerland

No–Ny
Nová Bystřice
 Heidenreichstein, Austria

Nová Role
 Breitenbrunn, Germany

Nová Včelnice

 Eggiwil, Switzerland
 Neuötting, Germany

Nové Město na Moravě

 Mizhhiria, Ukraine
 Waalre, Netherlands
 Ziano di Fiemme, Italy

Nové Město nad Metují

 Duszniki-Zdrój, Poland
 Gârnic, Romania
 Hilden, Germany
 Warrington, England, United Kingdom

Nové Město pod Smrkem

 Leśna, Poland
 Mirsk, Poland
 Świeradów-Zdrój, Poland

Nové Sedlo
 Schwarzenberg, Germany

Nové Strašecí
 Welden, Germany

Novosedly nad Nežárkou
 Trub, Switzerland

Nový Bor

 Aniche, France
 Břeclav, Czech Republic
 Frauenau, Germany
 Oybin, Germany
 Zwiesel, Germany

Nový Bydžov

 Brezno, Slovakia
 Cascinette d'Ivrea, Italy
 Nădlac, Romania

Nový Jičín

 Épinal, France
 Görlitz, Germany
 Kremnica, Slovakia
 Ludwigsburg, Germany
 Novellara, Italy
 Świętochłowice, Poland

Nový Knín
 Ledro, Italy

Nový Malín
 Sobótka, Poland

Nymburk

 Neuruppin, Germany
 Porto San Giorgio, Italy
 Vrútky, Slovakia

 Żarów, Poland

Nýřany
 Zeulenroda-Triebes, Germany

O
Odry

 Kuźnia Raciborska, Poland
 Niefern-Öschelbronn, Germany

Okříšky
 San Pier d'Isonzo, Italy

Oldřichov v Hájích
 Gozdnica, Poland

Olomouc

 Antony, France
 Kraków, Poland
 Kunming, China
 Lucerne, Switzerland
 Makarska, Croatia
 Nördlingen, Germany
 Old Town (Bratislava), Slovakia
 Owensboro, United States
 Pécs, Hungary
 Subotica, Serbia
 Tampere, Finland
 Veenendaal, Netherlands

Oloví
 Kastl, Germany

Opatov
 Drezzo (Colverde), Italy

Opava

 Katowice, Poland
 Kearney, United States
 Liptovský Mikuláš, Slovakia
 Racibórz, Poland
 Roth, Germany
 Zugló (Budapest), Hungary
 Żywiec, Poland

Opočno

 Opoczno, Poland
 Puteaux, France
 Radków, Poland

Orlické Záhoří
 Bystrzyca Kłodzka, Poland

Orlová

 Crikvenica, Croatia
 Czechowice-Dziedzice, Poland
 Illnau-Effretikon, Switzerland
 Námestovo, Slovakia
 Rydułtowy, Poland

Osečná

 Krotoszyce, Poland
 Markersdorf, Germany

Oslavany

 Nováky, Slovakia
 Schkeuditz, Germany
 Vir, Croatia

Osoblaha
 Izbicko, Poland

Ostrava

 Abomey, Benin
 Coventry, England, United Kingdom
 Dresden, Germany
 Gaziantep, Turkey
 Katowice, Poland
 Košice, Slovakia
 Miskolc, Hungary
 Oral, Kazakhstan
 Piraeus, Greece
 Pittsburgh, United States
 Shreveport, United States
 Split, Croatia

Ostrov

 Rastatt, Germany
 Wunsiedel, Germany

Otročiněves
 Laragh, Ireland

Otrokovice

 Dubnica nad Váhom, Slovakia
 Vác, Hungary
 Zawadzkie, Poland

P

Pa–Pl
Pacov
 Arni, Switzerland

Pardubice

 Bełchatów, Poland
 Çanakkale, Turkey
 Doetinchem, Netherlands
 Merano, Italy
 Pernik, Bulgaria
 Rosignano Marittimo, Italy
 Selb, Germany
 Skellefteå, Sweden
 Vysoké Tatry, Slovakia

Pec pod Sněžkou
 Karpacz, Poland

Pelhřimov

 Dolný Kubín, Slovakia
 Mukachevo, Ukraine
 St. Valentin, Austria

Petrovice u Karviné

 Godów, Poland
 Zebrzydowice, Poland

Petřvald

 Jasienica, Poland
 Strumień, Poland

Písek

 Caerphilly, Wales, United Kingdom
 Deggendorf, Germany
 Lemvig, Denmark
 Smiltene, Latvia
 Veľký Krtíš, Slovakia
 Wetzlar, Germany

Planá
 Tirschenreuth, Germany

Planá nad Lužnicí

 Gorenja Vas–Poljane, Slovenia
 Hluk, Czech Republic

Plánice
 Rubigen, Switzerland

Plavy
 Paszowice, Poland

Plesná

 Bad Brambach, Germany
 Eichenzell, Germany
 Erbendorf, Germany
 Rosenthal am Rennsteig, Germany

Plzeň

 Birmingham, United States
 Liège, Belgium
 Limoges, France
 Regensburg, Germany
 Takasaki, Japan
 Winterthur, Switzerland
 Žilina, Slovakia

Po
Poběžovice
 Schönsee, Germany

Počátky

 Konolfingen, Switzerland
 Lokca, Slovakia

Podbořany

 Ehrenfriedersdorf, Germany
 Russi, Italy
 Spalt, Germany

Poděbrady

 Netanya, Israel
 Piešťany, Slovakia
 Tharandt, Germany
 Vertou, France

Podolí

 Ay-sur-Moselle, France
 Kuchyňa, Slovakia

Pohořelice

 Brezová pod Bradlom, Slovakia
 Poraj, Poland

Pohoří
 Piława Górna, Poland

Police nad Metují

 Colli al Metauro, Italy
 Świdnica, Poland
 Travnik, Bosnia and Herzegovina

Polička

 Ebes, Hungary
 Hohenems, Austria

 Westerveld, Netherlands

Polná
 Wimmis, Switzerland

Popovice
 Kálnica, Slovakia

Postoloprty
 Wolkenstein, Germany

Postřekov

 Ascha, Germany
 Pakrac, Croatia

Postřelmov

 Kamenec pod Vtáčnikom, Slovakia
 Moyenneville, France
 Willingham by Stow, England, United Kingdom

Potštejn

 Pottenstein, Austria
 Pottenstein, Germany

Pozlovice
 Rajecké Teplice, Slovakia

Pozořice
 Ivanka pri Dunaji, Slovakia

Pr–Pt
Prachatice

 Castrocaro Terme e Terra del Sole, Italy
 Grainet, Germany
 Ignalina, Lithuania
 Impruneta, Italy
 Mauthausen, Austria
 Rahachow, Belarus
 Waldkirchen, Germany
 Zvolen, Slovakia

Prague

 Berlin, Germany
 Brussels, Belgium
 Chicago, United States
 Frankfurt am Main, Germany
 Hamburg, Germany
 Kyoto, Japan
 Miami-Dade County, United States
 Nuremberg, Germany
 Phoenix, United States
 Taipei, Taiwan

Prague 1

 Bamberg, Germany
 Batumi, Georgia
 Budavár (Budapest), Hungary
 Chaoyang (Beijing), China
 Ferrara, Italy
 Innere Stadt (Vienna), Austria
 Jongno (Seoul), South Korea
 Monza, Italy
 Nîmes, France
 Old Town (Bratislava), Slovakia
 Rosh HaAyin, Israel
 Trento, Italy

Prague 4

 Budva, Montenegro
 Snina, Slovakia
 Trešnjevka (Zagreb), Croatia

Prague 5

 Arad, Romania
 Kallithea, Greece
 Neukölln (Berlin), Germany
 Petržalka (Bratislava), Slovakia
 Saugues, France
 Trogir, Croatia
 Újbuda (Budapest), Hungary

Prague 6

 Bayreuth, Germany
 Dijon, France
 Drancy, France
 Khmelnytskyi, Ukraine

 Penzing (Vienna), Austria
 Poreč, Croatia
 Roncegno Terme, Italy
 Ružomberok, Slovakia

Prague 7

 Nové Mesto (Bratislava), Slovakia
 Teramo, Italy

Prague 8
 Old Town (Košice), Slovakia

Prague 9
 Anenii Noi District, Moldova

Prague 10

 Jasło, Poland

 Prešov, Slovakia

Prague 15

 Daruvar, Croatia
 Žilina, Slovakia

Prague 16 – Radotín
 Burglengenfeld, Germany

Prague 18 – Letňany
 Beautor, France

Prague 20 – Horní Počernice

 Brunsbüttel, Germany
 Mions, France

Pražmo
 Niemodlin, Poland

Přerov

 Bardejov, Slovakia
 Cuijk, Netherlands
 Děčín, Czech Republic
 Ivano-Frankivsk, Ukraine
 Kedzierzyn-Kozle, Poland
 Kotor, Montenegro
 Ozimek, Poland

Přestanov
 Drebach, Germany

Přeštice

 Chadron, United States
 Krško, Slovenia
 Nittenau, Germany

Příbor
 Przedbórz, Poland

Příbram

 Anor, France
 Freiberg, Germany
 Hoorn, Netherlands
 Kežmarok, Slovakia
 Königs Wusterhausen, Germany
 Ledro, Italy
 Villerupt, France

Přibyslav

 Mook en Middelaar, Netherlands
 Sliač, Slovakia

Přimda
 Pfreimd, Germany

Prostějov

 Środa Wielkopolska, Poland
 Vysoké Tatry, Slovakia

Ptice
 Ledro, Italy

R

Ra–Ri
Radomyšl
 Montoggio, Italy

Radslavice
 Raslavice, Slovakia

Rakovice
 Rakovice, Slovakia

Rakovník

 Dietzenbach, Germany
 Kościan, Poland
 Kráľovský Chlmec, Slovakia

Rapotín

 Opatovce nad Nitrou, Slovakia
 Paszowice, Poland

Raspenava

 Bischofswerda, Germany
 Gryfów Śląski, Poland

Ratíškovice
 Vouziers, France

Řeka

 Nová Bystrica, Slovakia
 Stará Bystrica, Slovakia

Říčany

 Albertslund, Denmark
 Borken, Germany
 Dainville, France
 Grabow, Germany
 Mölndal, Sweden
 Opatówek, Poland
 Whitstable, England, United Kingdom

Ro
Ročov
 Reichenbach im Vogtland, Germany

Rokycany

 Greiz, Germany
 Pfinztal, Germany

Rokytnice nad Jizerou
 Wojcieszów, Poland

Ropice

 Jaworze, Poland
 Pribylina, Slovakia

Rosice

 Lainate, Italy
 Rimóc, Hungary
 Strenči, Latvia

Rotava
 Veitshöchheim, Germany

Roudnice nad Labem

 Dessau-Roßlau, Germany
 Ruelle-sur-Touvre, France

Rousínov

 Dervio, Italy
 Halásztelek, Hungary
 Podbranč, Slovakia

Rožmberk nad Vltavou
 Freistadt, Austria

Rožnov pod Radhoštěm

 Bergen, Germany
 Körmend, Hungary
 Považská Bystrica, Slovakia
 Śrem, Poland

Roztoky
 Skawina, Poland

Rt–Ry
Rtyně v Podkrkonoší

 Elstra, Germany
 Jelcz-Laskowice, Poland

Ruda nad Moravou
 Kanianka, Slovakia

Rudolfov
 Sandl, Austria

Rusín
 Głubczyce, Poland

Rychnov nad Kněžnou
 Kłodzko, Poland

Rýmařov

 Arco, Italy
 Belœil, Belgium
 Crosne, France
 Krompachy, Slovakia

 Ozimek, Poland
 Rajec, Slovakia
 Schotten, Germany
 Zeil am Main, Germany

S

Sa–Sk
Šatov
 Semerovo, Slovakia

Sebranice
 Zlatá Baňa, Slovakia

Seč
 Radzovce, Slovakia

Sedlčany

 Taverny, France
 Wągrowiec County, Poland

Semily

 Kolochava, Ukraine
 Schauenburg, Germany

Šenov
 Strumień, Poland

Sezemice
 Neuville-Saint-Vaast, France

Sezimovo Ústí
 Thierachern, Switzerland

Skalice u České Lípy
 Bertsdorf-Hörnitz, Germany

Skalná
 Neusorg, Germany

Sl–Sp
Slaný

 Pegnitz, Germany
 Skalica, Slovakia

Šlapanice
 Braine-l'Alleud, Belgium

Slatiňany

 Likavka, Slovakia
 Rorbas, Switzerland

Slavičín

 Horná Súča, Slovakia
 Horné Srnie, Slovakia
 Nová Dubnica, Slovakia
 Uhrovec, Slovakia

Slavkov u Brna

 Darney, France
 Horn, Austria
 Pag, Croatia
 Sławków, Poland
 Zeist, Netherlands

Slavonice

 Bogen, Germany
 Dobersberg, Austria
 Stakčín, Slovakia

Slopné
 Slopná, Slovakia

Sloup v Čechách
 Stolpen, Germany

Smiřice
 Boguszów-Gorce, Poland

Smržovka

 Rammenau, Germany
 Weidenberg, Germany

Soběslav
 Sabinov, Slovakia

Sobotka

 Sobótka, Poland
 Wadern, Germany

Sokolov

 Saalfeld, Germany
 Schwandorf, Germany

Spálené Poříčí
 Ralbitz-Rosenthal, Germany

Špindlerův Mlýn

 Alanya, Turkey
 Podgórzyn, Poland

St
Stará Ves nad Ondřejnicí

 Lipowa, Poland
 Raková, Slovakia

Staré Město (Šumperk District)
 Stronie Śląskie, Poland

Staré Město (Uherské Hradiště District)

 Sées, France
 Tönisvorst, Germany

Staré Město pod Landštejnem
 Rača (Bratislava), Slovakia

Starý Hrozenkov
 Darłowo, Poland

Starý Poddvorov is a member of the Charter of European Rural Communities, a town twinning association across the European Union, alongside with:

 Bienvenida, Spain
 Bièvre, Belgium
 Bucine, Italy
 Cashel, Ireland
 Cissé, France
 Desborough, England, United Kingdom
 Esch (Haaren), Netherlands
 Hepstedt, Germany
 Ibănești, Romania
 Kandava (Tukums), Latvia
 Kannus, Finland
 Kolindros, Greece
 Lassee, Austria
 Medzev, Slovakia
 Moravče, Slovenia
 Næstved, Denmark
 Nagycenk, Hungary
 Nadur, Malta
 Ockelbo, Sweden
 Pano Lefkara, Cyprus
 Põlva, Estonia
 Samuel (Soure), Portugal
 Slivo Pole, Bulgaria
 Strzyżów, Poland
 Tisno, Croatia
 Troisvierges, Luxembourg
 Žagarė (Joniškis), Lithuania

Štěchovice

 Kalmthout, Belgium
 San Juan Nepomuceno, Paraguay

Štěpánov
 Środa Śląska, Poland

Šternberk

 Dobšiná, Slovakia
 Günzburg, Germany
 Kobiór, Poland
 Kungsbacka, Sweden
 Lorsch, Germany
 Sajószentpéter, Hungary

Štítná nad Vláří-Popov
 Košeca, Slovakia

Štíty

 Belvedere Ostrense, Italy
 Niemodlin, Poland

Stochov

 Bourbon-Lancy, France
 Saarwellingen, Germany

Strahovice

 Krzanowice, Poland
 Ruppach-Goldhausen, Germany

Strakonice

 Bad Salzungen, Germany
 Calderdale, England, United Kingdom
 Lengnau, Switzerland

Strání
 Euratsfeld, Austria

Strážnice
 Skalica, Slovakia

Střelice

 Assago, Italy
 Nozay, France

Stříbro

 Fano, Italy
 Moncoutant, France
 Oelsnitz, Germany
 Vohenstrauß, Germany

Strmilov
 Trubschachen, Switzerland

Strunkovice nad Blanicí
 Stocken-Höfen, Switzerland

Studená
 Beemster, Netherlands

Studenec
 Zuberec, Slovakia

Studénka
 Dąbrowa Górnicza, Poland

Su–Sv
Suchdol nad Lužnicí
 Brand-Nagelberg, Austria

Sudice
 Pietrowice Wielkie, Poland

Šumperk

 Bad Hersfeld, Germany
 Ebreichsdorf, Austria
 Maarssen (Stichtse Vecht), Netherlands
 Mikulov, Czech Republic
 Nysa, Poland
 Prievidza, Slovakia
 Sulmona, Italy
 Vaasa, Finland

Sušice is a member of the Douzelage, a town twinning association of towns across the European Union. Sušice also has two other twin towns.

Douzelage
 Agros, Cyprus
 Altea, Spain
 Asikkala, Finland
 Bad Kötzting, Germany
 Bellagio, Italy
 Bundoran, Ireland
 Chojna, Poland
 Granville, France
 Holstebro, Denmark
 Houffalize, Belgium
 Judenburg, Austria
 Kőszeg, Hungary
 Marsaskala, Malta
 Meerssen, Netherlands
 Niederanven, Luxembourg
 Oxelösund, Sweden
 Preveza, Greece
 Rokiškis, Lithuania
 Rovinj, Croatia
 Sesimbra, Portugal
 Sherborne, England, United Kingdom
 Sigulda, Latvia
 Siret, Romania
 Škofja Loka, Slovenia
 Tryavna, Bulgaria
 Türi, Estonia
 Zvolen, Slovakia
Other

 Uetendorf, Switzerland
 Wenzenbach, Germany

Svatý Jan nad Malší
 Grünbach, Austria

Světlá Hora

 Polska Cerekiew, Poland
 Rieste, Germany

Svitavy

 Lądek-Zdrój, Poland
 Perechyn, Ukraine

 Stendal, Germany
 Strzelin, Poland
 Žiar nad Hronom, Slovakia

T
Tábor

 Dole, France
 Konstanz, Germany
 Nové Zámky, Slovakia
 Orinda, United States
 Škofja Loka, Slovenia
 Wels, Austria

Tanvald

 Burbach, Germany
 Lubomierz, Poland
 Marcinowice, Poland
 Wittichenau, Germany

Telč

 Belp, Switzerland
 Figeac, France
 Rothenburg ob der Tauber, Germany
 Šaľa, Slovakia
 Waidhofen an der Thaya, Austria
 Wilber, United States

Teplá
 Konnersreuth, Germany

Teplice nad Bečvou
 Šmarješke Toplice, Slovenia

Teplice nad Metují
 Jaworzyna Śląska, Poland

Terezín

 Dębno, Poland
 Komárno, Slovakia
 Strausberg, Germany

Těrlicko
 Chybie, Poland

Těšany
 Ruše, Slovenia

Tišnov

 Moldava nad Bodvou, Slovakia
 Sereď, Slovakia
 Sulejów, Poland

Tlučná
 Floß, Germany

Třebechovice pod Orebem
 Bethlehem, Palestine

Třebíč

 Humenné, Slovakia
 Lilienfeld, Austria
 Oschatz, Germany
 Rakhiv, Ukraine
 Yichang, China

Třeboň

 Freyung-Grafenau (district), Germany
 Interlaken, Switzerland
 Schrems, Austria
 Utena, Lithuania

Třešť
 Obergünzburg, Germany

Trhová Kamenice
 Oberembrach, Switzerland

Třinec

 Bielsko-Biała, Poland
 Žilina, Slovakia

Trmice
 Königstein, Germany

Trpín
 Palkonya, Hungary

Trutnov

 Kamienna Góra, Poland
 Kępno, Poland
 Lohfelden, Germany
 Senica, Slovakia
 Strzelin, Poland
 Świdnica, Poland
 Würzburg, Germany

Tupesy
 Nedašovce, Slovakia

Turnov

 Alvesta, Sweden
 Idar-Oberstein, Germany
 Jawor, Poland
 Keszthely, Hungary
 Murska Sobota, Slovenia
 Niesky, Germany

Týniště nad Orlicí
 Čierny Balog, Slovakia

U
Uherské Hradiště

 Bridgwater, England, United Kingdom
 Krosno, Poland
 Mayen, Germany
 Sárvár, Hungary
 Skalica, Slovakia

Uherský Brod

 Gierałtowice, Poland
 Gooise Meren, Netherlands
 Nové Mesto nad Váhom, Slovakia
 Ourém, Portugal

Uherský Ostroh
 Trenčianska Teplá, Slovakia

Uničov

 Bieruń-Lędziny County, Poland
 Dubno, Ukraine
 Jelšava, Slovakia
 Lędziny, Poland
 Roccagorga, Italy

Úpice
 Piechowice, Poland

Úsov
 Lazany, Slovakia

Ústí nad Labem

 Chemnitz, Germany
 Halton, England, United Kingdom

Ústí nad Orlicí

 Amberg, Germany
 Bystrzyca Kłodzka, Poland
 Massa Martana, Italy
 Neukölln (Berlin), Germany
 Poprad, Slovakia

V

Va–Ve
Valašské Klobouky

 Zelów, Poland

Valašské Meziříčí

 Balchik, Bulgaria
 Budva, Montenegro
 Čačak, Serbia 
 Čadca, Slovakia
 Gooise Meren, Netherlands
 Konin, Poland
 Partizánske, Slovakia
 Sevlievo, Bulgaria
 Velké Meziříčí, Czech Republic

Valeč
 Drebach, Germany

Vejprty
 Bärenstein, Germany

Velichovky
 Jedlina-Zdrój, Poland

Velká Bíteš

 Hanušovce nad Topľou, Slovakia
 Torrevecchia Pia, Italy

Velká Kraš
 Neuburg an der Donau, Germany

Velká nad Veličkou
 Nowy Dwór Gdański, Poland

Velká Polom
 Dlhá nad Oravou, Slovakia

Velké Bílovice

 Presidencia Roque Sáenz Peña, Argentina
 Šenkvice, Slovakia

Velké Meziříčí

 České Meziříčí, Czech Republic
 Tisno, Croatia
 Valašské Meziříčí, Czech Republic
 Vansbro, Sweden

Velké Opatovice

 Elbingerode, Germany
 Stari Grad, Croatia

Velké Pavlovice

 Échenon, France
 Senica, Slovakia
 Ždírec nad Doubravou, Czech Republic

Velké Přílepy
 Zlaté Moravce, Slovakia

Velký Šenov
 Lwówek Śląski, Poland

Vendryně
 Goleszów, Poland

Veřovice

 Hendungen, Germany
 Lampertswalde, Germany

Veselí nad Lužnicí

 Diemtigen, Switzerland
 Yspertal, Austria

Veselí nad Moravou

 Crespellano (Valsamoggia), Italy
 Malacky, Slovakia
 Żnin, Poland

Větřní
 Lotzwil, Switzerland

Vi–Vy
Vidnava
 Neuburg an der Donau, Germany

Vigantice
 Ludrová, Slovakia

Vimperk
 Freyung, Germany

Vítkov

 Kalety, Poland
 Vrbové, Slovakia

Vlachovo Březí
 Sankt Oswald-Riedlhütte, Germany

Vlčice
 Biała, Poland

Vodňany

 Kisbér, Hungary
 Oravský Podzámok, Slovakia
 Sieraków, Poland
 Wartberg ob der Aist, Austria
 Zlaté Hory, Czech Republic

Volary

 Grainet, Germany
 Waldkirchen, Germany
 Wallern an der Trattnach, Austria

Volyně

 Aidenbach, Germany
 Kováčová, Slovakia

Vratimov
 Senj, Croatia

Vrbno pod Pradědem
 Głogówek, Poland

Vrchlabí

 Baunatal, Germany
 Kowary, Poland
 Trouville-sur-Mer, France

Vřesina
 Kornowac, Poland

Všeň
 Ledro, Italy

Všeradice
 Gârnic, Romania

Vsetín

 Bytom, Poland
 Mödling, Austria
 Stará Ľubovňa, Slovakia
 Trenčianske Teplice, Slovakia
 Vrgorac, Croatia

Vyškov

 Cognac, France
 Döbeln, Germany
 Jarosław, Poland
 Michalovce, Slovakia
 Virovitica, Croatia

Vysoké Mýto

 Dolni Chiflik, Bulgaria
 Korbach, Germany
 Odessos District (Varna), Bulgaria
 Ozorków, Poland
 Pyrzyce, Poland
 Spišská Belá, Slovakia

Z
Zábřeh

 Handlová, Slovakia
 Ochsenfurt, Germany

Žacléř

 Goldkronach, Germany
 Kowary, Poland
 Lubawka, Poland
 Lwówek Śląski County, Poland

Žamberk

 Fresagrandinaria, Italy

 Nowa Sól, Poland
 Püttlingen, Germany
 Rice Lake, United States
 Saint-Michel-sur-Orge, France
 Senftenberg, Germany
 Senftenberg, Austria
 Veszprém, Hungary

Žarošice
 Snina, Slovakia

Zašová
 Nová Ľubovňa, Slovakia

Žatec

 Krasnystaw, Poland
 Poperinge, Belgium
 Thum, Germany
 Žalec, Slovenia

Žďár nad Sázavou

 Cairanne, France
 Flobecq, Belgium
 Khust, Ukraine
 Schmölln, Germany

Ždírec nad Doubravou

 Michelhausen, Austria
 Velké Pavlovice, Czech Republic

Zdobnice
 Bystrzyca Kłodzka, Poland

Železná Ruda

 Aldeno, Italy
 Bayerisch Eisenstein, Germany
 Zernez, Switzerland

Železnice
 Revò, Italy

Železný Brod

 Lauscha, Germany
 Olszyna, Poland

Želiv
 Kiesen, Switzerland

Židlochovice

 Gbely, Slovakia
 Montevago, Italy

Žirovnice

 Grosshöchstetten, Switzerland
 Trstená, Slovakia

Zlaté Hory

 Głuchołazy, Poland
 Kętrzyn, Poland
 Vodňany, Czech Republic

Zlín

 Altenburg, Germany
 Chorzów, Poland
 Groningen, Netherlands
 Izegem, Belgium
 Limbach-Oberfrohna, Germany
 Möhlin, Switzerland
 Romans-sur-Isère, France
 Sesto San Giovanni, Italy
 Trenčín, Slovakia

Žlutice

 Hurbanovo, Slovakia
 Warmensteinach, Germany

Znojmo

 Chrudim, Czech Republic
 Nové Zámky, Slovakia
 Pontassieve, Italy
 Povo (Trento), Italy
 Retz, Austria
 Ružinov (Bratislava), Slovakia
 Strzegom, Poland
 Torgau, Germany
 Villazzano (Trento), Italy

Zubří

 Furth an der Triesting, Austria
 Palárikovo, Slovakia
 Považská Bystrica, Slovakia
 Rosdorf, Germany

References

Czech Republic
Lists of municipalities of the Czech Republic
Foreign relations of the Czech Republic
Cities and towns in the Czech Republic
Populated places in the Czech Republic